Launceston  (rarely spelled Lanson as a local abbreviation) is a town, ancient borough, and civil parish in Cornwall, England, United Kingdom. The landscape of the town is generally steep particularly at a sharp south-western knoll topped by Launceston Castle. These gradients fall down to the River Kensey and smaller tributaries.

The town centre itself is bypassed and is no longer physically a main thoroughfare. The A388 still runs through the town close to the centre. The town remains figuratively the "gateway to Cornwall", due to having the A30, one of the two dual carriageways into the county, pass directly next to the town. The other dual carriageway and alternative main point of entry is the A38 at Saltash over the Tamar Bridge and was completed in 1962. There are smaller points of entry to Cornwall on minor roads.

Launceston Steam Railway narrow-gauge heritage railway runs as a tourist attraction during the summer months. It was restored for aesthetic and industrial heritage purposes and runs along a short rural route, it is popular with visitors but does not run for much of the year.

Launceston Castle was built by Robert, Count of Mortain (half-brother of William the Conqueror),  1070 to control the surrounding area. Launceston was the caput of the feudal barony of Launceston and of the Earldom of Cornwall until replaced by Lostwithiel in the 13th century. Launceston was later the county town of Cornwall until 1835 when Bodmin replaced it.

Two civil parishes serve the town and its outskirts, of which the central more built-up administrative unit housed 8,952 residents at the 2011 census.

Three electoral wards include reference to the town, their total population, from 2011 census data, being 11,837 and two ecclesiastical parishes serve the former single parish, with three churches and a large swathe of land to the north and west part of the area.

Launceston's motto  (English translation: Royal and Loyal) is a reference to its adherence to the Cavalier cause during the English Civil War of the mid-17th century.

History
The Cornish name of "Launceston", Lannstevan, means the "church enclosure of St Stephen" and is derived from the former monastery at St Stephen's a few miles north-west (the castle and town were originally named Dunheved) and the Common Brittonic placename element lan-. Dunheved was the Southwestern Brittonic name for the town in the West Saxon period.

The earliest known Cornish mint was at Launceston, which operated on a minimal scale at the time of Æthelred the Unready before Cornwall received full diocesan jurisdiction in 994. Only one specimen is known to exist. In the reign of William the Conqueror, the mint was moved to Dunheved and remained in existence until the reign of Henry II, 1160. During the reign of Henry III of England, another mint was established in Launceston.

Launceston Castle, in good repair, is a Norman motte-and-bailey castle, and was built by Robert, Count of Mortain (half-brother of William the Conqueror)  to dominate the surrounding area. Launceston was the caput of the feudal barony of Launceston and of the Earldom of Cornwall until replaced by Lostwithiel in the 13th century. Launceston was later the county town of Cornwall until 1835 when Bodmin replaced it. The lands of Robert, Count of Mortain, became the core holdings of the feudal barony of Launceston, and the Fleming family continued to hold most of their manors from that barony, as can be seen from entries in the Book of Fees.

In the Domesday Book (1086) it is recorded that Launceston was held by the Count of Mortain, and that he had his castle there. There was land for 10 ploughs, 1 villein and 13 smallholders with 4 ploughs, 2 mills which paid 40 shillings (£2 sterling) and 40 acres of pasture. The value of the manor was only £4 though it had formerly been worth £20.

The Roman Catholic saint and martyr Cuthbert Mayne was executed at Launceston in 1577; a legacy of memorials and a church exists.

Civil War
During the English Civil War Launceston was known to be  to Charles I of England, hence its coat of arms. His son, who was later crowned Charles II of England, stayed in the town for a couple of days en route to the Cavalier army based further west.

In 1643, the Parliamentarian forces under the command of Major General James Chudleigh advanced in an attempt to capture Launceston from the Royalists. The Royalist commander, Ralph Hopton, 1st Baron Hopton, stationed his forces on the summit of Beacon Hill, a steep hill which overlooks the town. The Parliamentarians captured the foot of the hill, but were unable to dislodge the Royalist forces from the top. Hopton led a counterattack down the hill and, despite fierce fighting and the arrival of Parliamentary reinforcements, forced Chudleigh's troops to retreat.

Sir Richard Grenville, 1st Baronet was committed by Prince Charles to Launceston Prison for refusing to obey Lord Hopton; Grenville had already quarrelled with General George Goring, Lord Goring.

Later history
Launceston has the only document in the UK signed by Mary II of England and her husband, William III of England. The very poor means of transport within Cornwall, which did not begin to be improved until the late 18th century, meant that assizes were held in Launceston. When the situation had been improved Bodmin became the county town where the assizes were held (at the Shire Hall there in 1838). Launceston's role as the de facto county town of Cornwall became established in the 13th century but it was never officially designated as the county town.

Viscount Launceston was a title of nobility created in 1726 (as Viscount of Launceston) but is now extinct. In the early 19th century, Launceston gave its name to the settlement, Launceston, Tasmania, which is now the second largest city in Tasmania.

During World War Two, racial tensions in the ranks of American soldiers sparked a shootout in the town square. Fourteen African American soldiers of the 581st Ordnance Ammunition Company were charged with mutiny.

Geography

Launceston is a market town, castle, recreational and heritage railway visitor town and the main shopping centre for the adjoining rural areas of west Devon and east Cornwall. The town is mainly built on the south side of a large hill almost immune to flooding, unlike its northern neighbourhood, Newport in part on a slightly wider plain at the bottom of the hill, which is susceptible to flooding by the River Kensey.

The suburb of Newport is recorded for the first time during the 13th century. The natural advantages of the Launceston district had been recognised by the Anglo-Saxon monks of St Stephen and by the Norman lord of Cornwall in the reign of King William I. At this point in the course of the River Tamar it is joined by four tributaries within a short distance and its floodplain is relatively large, while further south the Tamar valley is narrow and meandering.

Launceston is connected to the A30 trunk route, a dual carriageway bypass carrying its road traffic south of the town. The bypass crosses the River Tamar on the Dunheved Bridge built in 1975–1976 and substantially rebuilt 2006–2007. It is roughly midway between the north coast of Cornwall (at Bude) and the south coast (at Saltash).

Launceston civil parish comprises the town whereas St Stephens by Launceston Rural civil parish covers all outskirts, save for those south of the town. These each convene to discuss events funding, recreational funding and general planning matters.

Stourscombe SSSI, a geological Site of Special Scientific Interest,  to the east of Launceston, is designated ″... for the best inland exposure of the Upper Devonian in South West England and the type locality of the Stourscombe Beds (Upper Famennian).″

Notable buildings

Part of the town wall is still in existence including the South Gate of two arches. The White Hart Hotel incorporates a Norman doorway possibly removed from the Friary at St Thomas'. New Bridge (early 16th century) crosses the River Tamar: it is of granite. Two old bridges cross the River Kensey: one mediaeval and one built in 1580. The Baptist chapel is late 18th century and a number of Georgian houses may also be seen.

Three nonconformist churches/chapels served the 19th-century town: Wesleyan Methodist, Bible Christian, and Calvinist. North Cornwall and West Devon's Elim Pentecostal Church is in the town.

Lawrence House, a Grade II* listed building on Castle St, houses the town museum.

Madford is a house built in the second half of the 17th century by Sir Hugh Piper. By 1777 it came into the possession of Richard Vyvyan of Trelowarren through his marriage to Philippa Piper. Philip Vyvyan, son of Richard, conveyed it to the Rev. John Lethbridge whose successors were attorneys and also town clerks and deputy recorders of Launceston. The legal firm of Lethbridge was joined in 1828 by Charles Gurney who in 1833 became town clerk, an office he held until 1867. The next town clerk was John Lethbridge Cowlard who bought Madford from his uncle in 1841 (he was also borough treasurer for over 50 years).

Administration

Launceston was a Parliamentary Borough from medieval times, with the right to return two members of parliament. However, before the 19th-century Reform Acts the right to vote was not held by all the residents but only by the freemen of the borough, and by 1832 there were fewer than 50 and it had come to be regarded as a rotten borough, one of many in Cornwall. Neighbouring Newport was also a borough with two MPs of its own. Launceston lost one of its two MPs and Newport both by the Great Reform Act of 1832; the area included in the borough of Launceston was considerably extended to enable the franchise to be opened up. It finally lost its right to separate representation in 1885, and became part of a new county constituency of Cornwall named after the town. Since 1918 it has been part of the North Cornwall parliamentary constituency. The current MP, since 2015, is the Conservative Scott Mann.

Launceston was once regarded as the capital of Cornwall (although it was never officially the county town - see above), and in 1973 the Prince of Wales visited to receive his feudal dues from the Duchy of Cornwall.

The arms of the town are Gu. a triple circular tower in a pyramidal form Or the first battlements mounted with cannon of the last, all within a bordure Az. charged with eight towers domed on the second. A badge was granted on 26 Mar 1906, being the first ever granted to a civic body: A keep or castle Gold.

Launceston is twinned with Plestin-les-Grèves in Brittany, France. The town council is based in Launceston Guildhall and Town Hall.

Economy
The outskirts of Launceston host some large retail businesses with convenience, niche and fine weather tourist-catering commerce in the town centre. The three main industrial estates are Pennygillam, Scarne and Newport.

Launceston is located on the A30 trunk road into Cornwall and has a number of transport based business mainly located in Pennygillam Industrial estate. A major local business is the DS Smith packaging products manufacturing plant. Launceston is located in predominately rural area and has a number of business dedicated to supporting the surrounding rural economy.

The town has several restaurants, cafés, takeaways and a number of pubs. There are fewer pubs than in the Victorian era, a national trend with the larger ones tending to survive which specialise in their food, others of which provide live music events on a weekly basis.

A tucking mill was established in the 15th century by the Flemings in the north of the town (Newport), water-powered, continuing in use for corn until 1968. A manuscript left by Richard Robbins (died 1910) records eight tanneries in the town in the 19th century. A mechanics' institute was founded in 1847 at the Central Subscription Room. The gasworks was established as early as 1834 by Waygood & Porter of Beaminster.

The Duchy Originals company first manufactured its products in 2006 by opening a factory in Launceston making sweet and savoury pastry products but made a loss of £447,158 in the financial year 2006/07. During 2009 the bakery in Launceston was sold at a loss, contributing to the Duchy Originals company making a loss for 2009 - 10.

The Natural Fibre Company (TNFC) is a British wool mill based in Launceston and is the only small-scale full range textile mill in the UK. The main focus of the business is to add value to naturally coloured raw fleece which is bought from farmers, smallholders and rare sheep breeders.

Culture

The poet Charles Causley was a native and long-standing resident of the town where he was both born and died. He was at one time contender for Poet Laureate and died in 2003, aged 86. His grave is in the St Thomas Churchyard near the house he lived in, which carries a blue plaque. He contributed the account of Launceston to a feature in the Sunday Times magazine called "Village England". He describes it as belonging to England rather than to Cornwall " Launceston is one of the most important towns in Daphne du Maurier's novel Jamaica Inn.

Launceston annually hosted the "Castle Rock" music festival in July, which took place on the lower grounds of the castle which overlooks the town (within the outer walls). As well as a vibrant mix of local bands, the 2006 festival was headlined by Capdown which massively improved the event's profile. The first concert was performed in 2000 and featured a young artist who was unknown at the time, Jamie Cullum. The festival was headlined on two occasions by local Rock band Syrup, who were signed to Great West Records, which was set up by Big Country bass player, Tony Butler, and his long-term friend, Luke Maguire.

The Cornish & Devon Post is one of the newspapers for the district and its office is in the town. Local-specific editions of the paper and other publications are produced. It was founded in 1856 and incorporates the Launceston Weekly News. The Cornish Guardian North Cornwall edition covers Launceston. Four FM radio stations can be received: BBC Radio Cornwall, Pirate FM, Heart West, and Radyo an Gernewegva (online or via large aerials). In December 2013 a periodic community audio magazine was incepted The Launceston Podcast with catch-up services online.

Sporting clubs include amateur football club Launceston F.C. who play at Pennygillam, rugby union side Launceston Rugby Club who play at Polson Bridge, Launceston Cricket Club, Launceston Golf Club and Dunheved Bowling Club.

There are three community-based drama groups within Launceston itself. Oksigen Theatre is mainly concerned with training children in acting and produces one high quality show each year under the direction of Oksana Wroath, an ex-professional Russian stage actress.

Places of worship

The Grade I listed church of St Mary Magdalene was built in 1511–1524 by Sir Henry Trecarrel of Trecarrel near the town as a memorial to his infant son who died whilst being bathed. The ornate carvings in granite originally carved for the mansion he began to build at Trecarrel, Lezant have withstood the test of time. The tower dates from the 14th century, an earlier church and graveyard having occupied the site. Its grand organ was presented by a member of the Morice family of Werrington Park. The donor was either Sir William Morice (1707–1750) or his successor, Humphry Morice MP (1723–1785). The casework is elaborate and has been described as "a superb example of 18th century woodwork; the 18th century pipework is also of very high quality".

On St Stephen's Hill the main road through the north of the town is the Roman Catholic church consecrated to Cuthbert Mayne (see #History) designed by Arthur Langdon in a blend of Byzantine and Romanesque. It was built in 1911 by local mason F. H. Nicholls of Lewannick, with carpentry by J. H. Harry, the oak doors by a Mr Clifton of Ashwater, and the copper dome by T. Chapman (junior) of Launceston. The lady chapel was added in 1933.

Education
Five schools are in the town:
Four primary schools - St Catherine's Church of England Primary, St Stephen's Community Primary School and Launceston Community Primary School (Windmill Hill Academy) cater for pupils aged 4 to 11.
St. Joseph's School, St Stephens Hill is an independent day school for boys and girls from age 3, going from nursery through the early years, junior department and into the senior school. The senior school boys and girls have been accepted into the sixth form from September 2012.
Launceston College was first established in 1409 and became a boys grammar school with boarding house before becoming fully inclusive and educating students aged 11 to 18 or 19.

A former student of Launceston College was actor Sir Roger Moore. In 1962, Horwell Grammar School for Girls, Dunheved Road, was merged with the school, and in 1965 the former Pennygillam School was added to form the present-day comprehensive school, which is still known as Launceston College. Since the 19th century (exact date unknown) the college has been at the southern end of Dunheved Road, approximately one kilometre from the town centre. In 1966, H. Spencer Toy, its principal, published A History of Education at Launceston detailing the development of education in the town and surrounding area.

Launceston Community Primary School has the colloquial pseudonym Windmill Primary School, being situated adjacent to the site of the town's former windmill for grinding grain in Coronation Park.

Transport

Launceston is no longer connected to the national railway network, but was for almost a century served by two railway lines. The Great Western Railway (GWR) branch from Plymouth terminated in the town and the London and South Western Railway (LSWR) Exeter to Padstow North Cornwall Railway passed through. The stations were adjacent. The GWR station closed to passengers in 1952 after which all trains used the LSWR station until the North Cornwall line closed in 1966. The site of the station has been redeveloped for light industrial use. The Launceston Steam Railway narrow-gauge heritage railway uses an adjacent site and runs for  westward to Newmills along the valley of the Kensey.

The closest main-line railway stations to Launceston are Bodmin Parkway ( by car) and Plymouth. There are regular bus services to Plymouth and Exeter St Davids railway station.

Notable residents

The writer and historian, Joan Rendell lived at Yeolmbridge near Launceston.

 The Rev. Francis Vyvyan Jago Arundell was born at Launceston in July 1780, being the only son of Thomas Jago, a solicitor in that town, who had married Catherine, a daughter of Mr. Bolt, a surgeon at Launceston. He was in later life the Rector of Landulph, an antiquary and an oriental traveller.
Charles Causley, poet
Mary Ann Davenport, actress, born at Launceston in 1759
James Ruse, a Cornishman from Launceston, arrived in New South Wales aboard the transport Scarborough, part of the First Fleet of Australian convict ships, in 1788.
John McGeoch, seminal post-punk guitarist
Agnes Prest, One of the "Marian Martyrs", was burned at the stake at Southernhay, Exeter on 15 August 1557
Sir Alfred Farthing Robbins, journalist, political biographer and freemason (born in Launceston in 1856), author of Launceston, Past and Present (1888)

References

External links

 Launceston Town Council
 
 
Launceston Then

 
Civil parishes in Cornwall
Market towns in Cornwall
Towns in Cornwall
Manors in Cornwall
Cornish capitals
History of Cornwall
Former county towns in England